Chelydra  is one of the two extant genera of the snapping turtle family, Chelydridae, the other being Macrochelys, the much larger alligator snapping turtle. The snapping turtles are native to the Americas, with Chelydra having three species, one in North America and two in Central America, one of which is also found in northwestern South America.

Species
The genus Chelydra has the following species:
 Chelydra acutirostris (W. Peters, 1862) – South American snapping turtle
 Chelydra rossignonii (Bocourt, 1868) – Central American snapping turtle
 Chelydra serpentina (Linnaeus, 1758) – common snapping turtle (North America)
 Chelydra floridana†
 Chelydra laticarinata†
 Chelydra sculpta†

The three extant Chelydra species were once all considered to be several subspecies of Chelydra serpentina, along with a fourth subspecies in Florida, Chelydra serpentina osceola. C. s. osceola is now considered to be synonymous with C. serpentina.

References

 
Turtle genera
Taxa named by August Friedrich Schweigger